The 2016 São Tomé (Island or Regional) First Division took place that season.  The club was the next in a few seasons that had 12 clubs. the competition began in 21 May and finished on 7 December. Geographically all clubs that took part in the Premier Division were in the east and almost all but UDRA were in the northeast where the regional and national capital is located. Sporting Praia Cruz won their 8th and recent title. A total of 132 matches were played and 362 goals were scored, more than half than last season.

Overview
Kê Morabeza and Santana FC were relegated from the Premier Division as they finished in the last two positions. Nevs and UDESCAI were champions of the Second Division and were promoted into the division for the following season.

Both Sporting Praia Cruz and Bairros Unidos scored the most goals numbering 45, third was UDRA with 43, and fourth was Aliança Nacional with 33. On the opposites, Kė Morabeza conceded the most with 56 and second was Correia with 49.

Teams

Championship table

Statistics 
Highest scoring match: UDRA 8-0 UD Correia (24 July at the 7th Round)

References

Football competitions in São Tomé and Príncipe
Sao Tome
Sao Tome
Sao Tome First Division